Systemic fundamental to a predominant social, economic, or political practice. This refers to:

In medicine
In medicine, systemic means affecting the whole body, or at least multiple organ systems. It is in contrast with topical or local.
Systemic administration, a route of administration of medication so that the entire body is affected
Systemic circulation, carries oxygenated blood from the heart to the body and then returns deoxygenated blood back to the heart
Systemic disease, an illness that affects multiple organs, systems or tissues, or the entire body
Systemic effect, an adverse effect of an exposure that affects the body as a whole, rather than one part
Systemic inflammatory response syndrome, an inflammatory state affecting the whole body, frequently in response to infection
Systemic lupus erythematosus, a chronic autoimmune connective tissue disease that can affect any part of the body
Systemic scleroderma, also known as systemic sclerosis, a systemic connective tissue disease
Systemic venous system, refers to veins that drain into the right atrium without passing through two vascular beds
Systemic exertion intolerance disease, a new name for chronic fatigue syndrome proposed by the Institute of Medicine in 2015

In biology
Systemic acquired resistance, a "whole-plant" resistance response that occurs following an earlier localized exposure to a pathogen
Systemic pesticide, a pesticide that enters and moves freely within the organism under treatment

Other uses
Systemic (amateur extrasolar planet search project), a research project to locate extrasolar planets using distributed computing
Systemic bias, the inherent tendency of a process to favor particular outcomes
Systemic functional grammar, a model of grammar that considers language as a system
Systemic functional linguistics, an approach to linguistics that considers language as a system
Systemic psychology or systems psychology, a branch of applied psychology based on systems theory and thinking
Systemic risk, the risk of collapse of an entire financial system or market, as opposed to risk associated with any one entity
Systemic shock, a shock to any system strong enough to drive it out of equilibrium, can refer to a change in many fields
Systemic therapy, a school of psychology dealing with the interactions of groups and their interactional patterns and dynamics

See also
 Systematic (disambiguation)
Systematics (disambiguation)
Systemics

de:Systemisch